Alonso Ruiz de Virués, O.F.M. (died 1545) was a Roman Catholic prelate who served as Bishop of Islas Canarias (1538–1545).

Biography
Alonso Ruiz de Virués was born in Olmedo, Spain 1480 and ordained a priest in the Order of Friars Minor.
On 12 Aug 1538, he was appointed during the papacy of Pope Paul III as Bishop of Islas Canarias.
He served as Bishop of Islas Canarias until his death on 19 January 1545.

References

External links and additional sources
 (for Chronology of Bishops)
 (for Chronology of Bishops)

16th-century Roman Catholic bishops in Spain
Bishops appointed by Pope Paul III
1480 births
1545 deaths
Franciscan bishops